Mary Elizabeth Turner (née Powell; 1854–1907) was an English embroiderer who exhibited her work at the 1890 exposition of the Arts and Crafts Exhibition Society, for which she wrote an essay on modern embroidery. Identified with the Arts and Crafts Movement,  she was a founder with May Morris of the Women’s Guild of Arts. Her father was Thomas Wilde Powell, a solicitor and stockbroker who was also a patron of architects and artists. One of her siblings was the artist, copyist and art patron Christiana Herringham. Her husband was the architect Hugh Thackeray Turner. One of her children, her daughter Christiana Ruth Turner, was the wife of climber George Mallory.

References

Further reading

Arts and Crafts Essays by Members of the Arts and Crafts Exhibition Society; with a new introduction by Peter Faulkner; Thoemmes Press (1996), .
Victorian Embroidery: An Authoritative Guide by Barbara Morris; Thomas Nelson and Sons (1962).
Edwardian Architecture: A Biographical Dictionary by Alexander Stuart Gray; Gerald Duckworth & Co. (1985), .

Arts and Crafts movement artists
Embroidery designers
1854 births
1907 deaths
British embroiderers